Shuanghudadao is a metro station of Zhengzhou Metro Chengjiao line.

Station layout 
The station is an elevated station with 3 levels. The ground level is for the entrances/exits and the 2nd level is for the station concourse and footbridges connecting Exit B. The 2 side platforms for Chengjiao line is on the 3rd level.

Exits

References 

Stations of Zhengzhou Metro
Chengjiao line, Zhengzhou Metro
Railway stations in China opened in 2017